Macro-Panoan is a hypothetical proposal linking four language families of Peru, Brazil, Bolivia, Paraguay, and Argentina that Kaufman (1994) says "seems promising". The Pano–Takanan connection is widely but not unanimously accepted. Kaufman (1990) also finds the Moseten–Chon connection fairly convincing. However, the deeper connection between these two groups is more tentative.

Pano–Takanan (?)
Mosetén–Chon (?)
Mosetenan
Chonan †

References

Pano-Tacanan languages
Proposed language families